The Pârâul Sărat is a right tributary of the river Olt in Romania. It flows into the Olt near Stolniceni, a southern part of Râmnicu Vâlcea.

References

Rivers of Romania
Rivers of Vâlcea County